Phronesis is the third studio album by British progressive metal band Monuments. It was released through Century Media Records on 5 October 2018. Phronesis is derived from the ancient Greek word for "wisdom". It is the band's last release with vocalist Chris Barretto and guitarist Olly Steele.

Background
The album was recorded at different stages in studios in different countries. Guitars and bass were recorded by Jim Pinder at Treehouse Studios in Derbyshire; the drums were performed, recorded and engineered by Anup Sastry; and Chris Barretto recorded his vocals with Cristian Machado at Soundwars Studios in New Jersey. Then mixing and mastering was completed by Joel Wanasek at JTW Music in Milwaukee.

The album has been well received by critics including Already Heard, Dead Press!, Distorted Sound, and Metal Injection.

Upon the release of the album the band commenced on a 31-date tour of the United Kingdom and mainland Europe over October and November with main support from Vola. In January 2019 Monuments will be performing headline shows in New Zealand, then on the Australian multi-date music festival Progfest.

Track listing

Personnel

Monuments
 Chris Barretto – vocals
 John Browne – guitar, production, engineering, editing, booklet design
 Olly Steele – guitar, production
 Adam Swan – bass
 Daniel Lang – drums

Additional musicians
 Anup Sastry – drums, engineering, tracking

Additional personnel
 Jim Pinder – bass engineering, guitar engineering
 Cristian Machado – vocal engineering
 Joel Wanasek – mixing, mastering
 Joe Wohlitz – mixing assistant
 Paul Ortiz – orchestration, sound design
 Will Cross – artwork
 Fall McKenzie – logo
 Frank Wesp – band photo

Charts

References

2018 albums
Monuments (metal band) albums